The Royal Signals Association (RSA) was formed in 1920 at the birth of the Corps from the Royal Engineers. The objects of the Association are:
 To provide comfort and relief either generally or individually to past and present signallers and their dependants who are in conditions of need, hardship or distress. 
 To foster comradeship and morale within the Corps family, serving and retired.

Structure

Working within Regimental Headquarters Royal Signals, based in Blandford Camp, Dorset, are the Royal Signals Benevolent Fund Grants Section and the Royal Signals Association Branches and Membership Section.  The RSBF Grants Section assists signallers by way of grants of money or paying for items to reduce hardship and distress suffered by serving and former members of the Corps.  Over £300,000 is allocated annually from this section.  The Membership Section maintains records of all the 63 branches located throughout the country and their members, plus those of affiliated groups,  which are linked to the Corps through unit history or location.  Any person who served with the Corps, including Regular, TA, National Service, ATS and WRAC is eligible to join the association.  Spouses are eligible to become Associate Members of the Association, through a branch.

Branches  

There are 63 local branches which meet regularly and are all around the UK.  Members may enjoy the company of fellow former Corps members and are kept informed of the latest happenings within the Association and Corps.  They hold a variety of other activities, including annual dinners and outings.  More than half the branches have their own standard, which is paraded at special events, both locally and nationally.  Additionally, branches usually make an effort for their standard to be present at funerals of members.  The association has divided the UK into 7 areas, each with its own Area Representative. Each branch is linked to the association’s Central Committee by its Area Representative.  The Committee meets twice a year, in spring and autumn, and is currently chaired by the Chairman of the Association.  The day-to-day affairs are overseen by the General Secretary, who is also known as the Regimental Secretary to the Corps.

External links
Official Website: Royal Signals Association

British veterans' organisations
Royal Corps of Signals
1920 establishments in the United Kingdom
Organizations established in 1920